The Nadezhda Cup is a trophy in the Kontinental Hockey League that was first awarded during the 2012-13 KHL season.

Participants in the Nadezhda Cup are all KHL teams that did not qualify for the Gagarin Cup playoffs.

Winners

See also
 Continental Cup
 Gagarin Cup 
 Opening Cup

References

External links
KHL official website

Kontinental Hockey League trophies and awards